Adrien Ulacq was a Flemish mathematician, best known for his logarithmic tables.

Life 
He was originally of Flemish ethnicity from Gouda, Holland.

Career 

In 1628, he modified the logarithmic tables of Briggs and added more details to them.

He filled up the gap in the numbers between 20,000 and 90,000 in the logarithmic tables.

The logarithmic tables produced by Ulacq proved to be extremely useful for land surveyors.

Honours 

His achievements in logarithms and mathematics have been noted by several authors and sources.

These include the Lexicon Technicum.

It also includes Diderot's Encyclopédie.

See also
Common logarithm
e (mathematical constant)
John Napier
Adriaan Vlacq

References

External links 
 https://web.archive.org/web/20120525165222/http://mathematics.health-tips-diseases.com/2011/04/logarithm.html

17th-century Dutch mathematicians
People from Gouda, South Holland